The Contrariants were an aristocratic faction in England in the early 14th century. They favoured the policies of the Lords Ordainers (1311) and opposed the Despensers, Hugh the Elder and Hugh the Younger. They were most prominent in the Welsh Marches and northern England.

During the civil war of 1321–1322, they fought against the Despensers and King Edward II. In war, however, they displayed marked disunity. Defeated, many were executed or else had their lands confiscated. Among those executed for treason were Thomas, 2nd Earl of Lancaster; Humphrey de Bohun, 4th Earl of Hereford; and Bartholomew Badlesmere.

One of the Contrariant leaders who escaped to France, Roger Mortimer, led an invasion of England in 1326, overthrowing Edward and executing the Despensers.

References

Further reading
Fryde, Natalie. The Tyranny and Fall of Edward II, 1321–1326. Cambridge University Press, 1979.
Waugh, Scott L. The Confiscated Lands of the Contrariants in Gloucestershire and Herefordshire in 1322: An Economic and Social Study. PhD diss., Royal Holloway, University of London, 1975.

14th-century English nobility
Despenser War
Factions